Garet Neal Reichow (born May 19, 1934) is a former professional American football player. A , 220 lb tight end from the University of Iowa, Reichow was drafted by the Detroit Lions in the fourth round of the 1956 NFL Draft. He was one of two  Minnesota Vikings (along with Hugh McElhenny) selected to the Pro Bowl after their inaugural 1961 season.

An All-Big Ten quarterback, Reichow starred at Iowa. He was the football team's MVP as a senior and left school as its all-time leader in total offense. The Detroit Lions took notice and selected Reichow, who also played in the 1955 basketball Final Four for Iowa, in the fourth round. Reichow contributed to the Lions’ 1957 NFL title as a receiver and back-up quarterback for Tobin Rote, who replaced the injured Bobby Layne as starting quarterback. Reichow saw relief duty at quarterback in the 1957 NFL Championship Game, when Rote left the game with the Lions leading, 52–14. He threw a 17 yard touchdown pass to Heisman Trophy winner Hop-along Cassady and the game finished 59-14. Three years later, Reichow was a member of the Eagles’ 1960 championship club.

On July 24, 1960, (Walt Kowalczyk)  was traded to the Detroit Lions in exchange for Reichow.

Reichow joined former teammate Norm Van Brocklin, who became the Minnesota Vikings first head coach where he was key to quarterback Fran Tarkenton’s success in 1961. Reichow played wide receiver and proved to be the rookie’s favorite target, catching 50 passes for 859 yards and 11 touchdowns. (Reichow’s 11 TD receptions stood 34 years as a single-season team record until broken by Cris Carter in 1995.)

No. 89 followed his Pro Bowl season with 39 receptions before moving to tight end his final years in purple. Known as “Old Reliable” and considered one of the team's toughest players, Reichow caught a combined 55 passes from his new position in 1963–64.

At the age of 31, and with the team stockpiling young receivers, Reichow's playing career ended when Van Brocklin cut him during the 1965 training camp and gave him a job scouting for the club.

Reichow's opinions and keen eye for talent have helped shape the Vikings for the majority of their 56 years. The former wide receiver and tight end has served in a variety of personnel roles during his five decades with the franchise. From scout to Director of Player Personnel to Director of Football Operations to Assistant General Manager for National Scouting to his current consultant role, which he assumed a few years ago, Reichow is one of the longest-serving employees in the NFL. His longevity and success in the fickle “Not For Long” league is all the more impressive considering his background when entering the personnel department in 1965. Jerry Reichow currently resides in Santa Fe, New Mexico, with his wife Carolyn Reichow.

References

External links
 

1934 births
Living people
American football quarterbacks
American football tight ends
Iowa Hawkeyes football players
Detroit Lions players
Philadelphia Eagles players
Minnesota Vikings players
Western Conference Pro Bowl players
People from Decorah, Iowa
Players of American football from Iowa